The ashy bulbul (Hemixos flavala) is a species of songbird in the bulbul family, Pycnonotidae. It is found on the Indian subcontinent and in Southeast Asia. Its natural habitats are subtropical or tropical moist lowland forest and subtropical or tropical moist montane forest.

Taxonomy and systematics
Formerly, some authorities classified the ashy bulbul in the genera Hypsipetes and Microscelis.

Subspecies
Five subspecies are currently recognized:
 H. f. flavala - Blyth, 1845: Found in the eastern Himalayas, north-eastern Bangladesh, north-western Myanmar and southern China 
 H. f. hildebrandi - Hume, 1874: Found in eastern Myanmar and north-western Thailand
 H. f. davisoni - Hume, 1877: Found in south-eastern Myanmar and south-western Thailand
 H. f. bourdellei - Delacour, 1926: Found in southern China, eastern Thailand, northern and central Laos
 H. f. remotus - (Deignan, 1957): Found in southern Indochina

Gallery

References

ashy bulbul
Birds of North India
Birds of Nepal
Birds of Eastern Himalaya
Birds of Yunnan
Birds of Southeast Asia
ashy bulbul
ashy bulbul
Taxonomy articles created by Polbot